Urs Tobler (born 4 March 1971) is a Swiss sports shooter. He competed in the men's 25 metre rapid fire pistol event at the 1996 Summer Olympics.

References

1971 births
Living people
Swiss male sport shooters
Olympic shooters of Switzerland
Shooters at the 1996 Summer Olympics
Place of birth missing (living people)